Issy ten Donkelaar (born 7 October 1941) is a retired Dutch football defender and later manager.

References

1941 births
Living people
Dutch footballers
FC Twente players
Heracles Almelo players
Eredivisie players
Association football defenders
Dutch football managers
Eredivisie managers
FC Twente managers